The Municipal Offices is a municipal building in Bowling Green Road in Kettering, Northamptonshire, England. The building accommodates the offices and meeting place of Kettering Town Council.

History

The first municipal building in Kettering was the Corn Exchange in the Market Square which was commissioned by a group of local businessmen who formed a company to raise funds for the building. It was designed by Edmund Francis Law in the Italianate style, built in red brick with stone facings and was completed in 1853. Internally, the principal rooms were the market hall on the ground floor and an assembly hall on the first floor which was used as a town hall, as a venue for county court hearings and as a drill hall for the 9th Battalion of the Northamptonshire Rifle Volunteers.

Following significant population growth, largely associated with the status of Kettering as a market town, the area became an urban district in 1894. The new council initially established its offices at the Corn Exchange, but subsequently moved to offices in the High Street and, after the area was advanced to the status of municipal borough in 1938, to new offices in London Road. The council rapidly outgrew the offices in London Road and, after Kettering Grammar School relocated from its premises at Bowling Green Road to new premises at Windmill Avenue in 1965, the council took the opportunity to acquire the vacant building in Bowling Green Road. The building had been designed by John Alfred Gotch in the Neo-Georgian style, built in red brick with stone facings and had been completed in 1913.

The design involved a symmetrical main frontage with thirteen bays facing onto Bowling Green Road with the end bays projected forward as pavilions; the central section of five bays, which slightly projected forward, featured a short flight of steps leading up to a doorway; there was a casement window on the first floor. The other bays in the central section featured tall casement windows flanked by Doric order columns, spanning the ground and first floors, and which supported a stone frieze, a brick entablature and a cornice. The second floor was fenestrated by a row of eight windows and was surmounted by a modillioned frieze, a brick entablature and a modillioned cornice and, at roof level, a lantern was installed. The end bays were blind but featured stone arches at second floor level. A council chamber was fitted inside the building and a porch was added when the former school was converted for municipal use in 1965.

A plaque was placed on the eastern end bay to reflect the twinning agreement that the council had entered into with Lahnstein in Germany a few years previously. The municipal building continued to serve as local seat of government after the enlarged Kettering Borough Council was formed in 1974 and another plaque was added to the eastern end bay after Kettering became a sister city to Kettering, Ohio in the United States in 1978. The building was reduced to the status of an area office for North Northamptonshire Council after the new council was formed with its headquarters in Corby in 2021. The building subsequently became the offices and meeting place of the newly-formed Kettering Town Council.

References

Government buildings completed in 1913
City and town halls in Northamptonshire
Buildings and structures in Kettering